Me and Her is a 2006 short film jointly commissioned by, the UK Film Council, Scottish Screen and Glasgow Media Access Centre. It is written and directed by Sarah Tripp and stars Karl Davies and Jo Hartley. The film follows the lives of two chambermaids working in an inner city hotel and was first screened at the Edinburgh Film Festival.

Plot
Coleen, who works as a chambermaid at an inner city hotel, is joined by Damien, who has reluctantly taken a job at the hotel to earn some money during his summer vacation. Whilst working together, they discover an unexpected attraction to one another. It is during their last working day that they confront the significance of this relationship.

Cast

References

External links 
 

2006 films
2000s English-language films